The 2019 FIBA Asia Champions Cup was the 28th staging of the FIBA Asia Champions Cup, the international basketball club tournament of FIBA Asia. The tournament took place in Thailand from 24 to 29 September 2019. Games were played at Stadium29 in Nonthaburi. Alvark Tokyo won their first title after losing in the final last year.

Qualification

The following clubs qualified to the main tournament:

Host

Draw

Group phase
All times are local (UTC+07:00)

Group A

Group B

Final round

Semifinals

Third place game

Final

Final ranking

Awards

All-Star Five

References

2019
Champions Cup